Sphyrospermum is a genus of flowering plants belonging to the family Ericaceae.

Its native range is Mexico to Tropical America.

Species:

 Sphyrospermum boekei Luteyn 
 Sphyrospermum buesii A.C.Sm. 
 Sphyrospermum buxifolium Poepp. & Endl.
 Sphyrospermum campanulatum Luteyn
 Sphyrospermum dissimile (S.F.Blake) Luteyn
 Sphyrospermum dolichanthum Luteyn
 Sphyrospermum flaviflorum A.C.Sm.
 Sphyrospermum glutinosum Luteyn & Pedraza
 Sphyrospermum grandiflorum Cornejo & Pedraza
 Sphyrospermum grandifolium (Hoerold) A.C.Sm.
 Sphyrospermum haughtii A.C.Sm.
 Sphyrospermum lanceolatum Luteyn
 Sphyrospermum linearifolium Al.Rodr. & J.F.Morales
 Sphyrospermum microphyllum Sleumer
 Sphyrospermum munchiqueense Luteyn
 Sphyrospermum muscicola (Hook.) A.C.Sm.
 Sphyrospermum revolutum Luteyn
 Sphyrospermum rotundifolium Luteyn
 Sphyrospermum sessiliflorum Luteyn
 Sphyrospermum sodiroi (Hoerold) A.C.Sm.
 Sphyrospermum spruceanum Sleumer
 Sphyrospermum xanthocarpum Pedraza

References

Vaccinioideae
Ericaceae genera